No Robbery (March 30, 1960 – August 31, 1985) was an American Thoroughbred racehorse owned by the renowned Whitney family's  Greentree Stable who won the Wood Memorial Stakes and went into the 1963 Kentucky Derby undefeated but finished fifth.

At stud, No Robbery sired Wind and Wuthering, the top-rated British two-year-old of 1981 and Track Robbery who was voted the Eclipse Award as the 1982 American Champion Older Female Horse. He was also the damsire of Estrapade who raced and won in France and in the United States, earning 1986 American Champion Female Turf Horse honors.

References
 No Robbery's pedigree and partial racing stats

1960 racehorse births
Racehorses bred in Kentucky
Racehorses trained in the United States
Thoroughbred family 19-b